Gliczarów may refer to the following places in Poland:

Gliczarów Dolny
Gliczarów Górny